Gold is a New Zealand radio station playing classic hits and classic rock of the 1970s and 1980s targeting an audience of listeners above 45 years of age.

Gold broadcasts as a network on AM and FM frequencies across New Zealand and is owned and operated by New Zealand Media and Entertainment (NZME). Its head office and studios are in central Auckland, alongside NZME's seven other radio networks.

History 
Gold went to air on 1 July 2020, taking over the FM frequencies held by Mix and the AM and low power FM frequencies previously used to broadcast Radio Sport.

Gold is a pure music format, while the AM/LPFM version carries a hybrid talk/music format aimed at the rural market.

On 17 June 2022, NZME announced that, after nearly two years, Gold AM would change its name to Gold Sport from 27 June 2022. The name change reflects what is currently broadcast on the station which includes live sport commentary, The Country with Jamie Mackay and The Country Sport Breakfast with Brian Kelly.

Programmes 
Gold and Gold Sport carry the majority of the same shows.

The AM/LPFM version of Gold referred to as Gold Sport does carry different programmes at times.  These are mainly sport and rural programmes that previously broadcast on Radio Sport, including The Country with Jamie Mackay and live sport commentary including Super Rugby, All Black tests, and netball.

Weekdays 
Andrew Dickens hosts the morning show on Gold each weekday morning from 6am – 12pm. 
Brian Kelly hosts The Country Sport Breakfast on Gold Sport from Tauranga each morning.  This show is a mixture of sport and rural interviews as well as music.

Each weekday morning between 9am - noon Gold features "No Ads 'Till Noon", a commercial free three hours. 

Tracey Donaldson hosts afternoons from 12pm - 6pm, with The Country with Jamie Mackay, presented from the Dunedin studios, airing between 12-1pm on Gold Sport only.
Rick Morin hosts the night show from 6pm - 11pm.

Weekends 
Weekend hosts on Gold include Grant Kereama and Dan Bernstone.
Gold Sport also broadcasts live international and domestic sports commentaries.

Stations 
Gold broadcasts on AM and FM frequencies as a network across New Zealand and streams on iHeartRadio.

Gold frequencies 

 Whangarei – 89.2 FM
 Auckland – 105.4 FM
 Tauranga – 99 FM
 Gisborne – 106.1 FM
 Wellington – 93.7 FM
 Nelson – 104 FM
 Greymouth – 91.5 FM / 97.1 FM
 Reefton - 99.9 FM
 Westport – 92.5 FM
 Christchurch (Sumner) – 91.7 FM
 Wānaka - 104.2 FM

Gold Sport frequencies 

 Whangarei – 729 AM
 Auckland – 1332 AM
 Waikato – 792 AM
 Tauranga – 1521 AM
 Rotorua – 1350 AM
 Taupo – 107.7 FM (low power)
 New Plymouth – 774 AM / 87.8 FM (low power)
 South Taranaki −1557 AM / 88.2 FM (low power)
 Napier – 1125 AM
 Whanganui – 1062 AM
 Manawatu – 1089 AM
 Masterton – 87.6 FM (low power)
 Wellington – 1503 AM
 Nelson – 549 AM
 Christchurch – 1503 AM
 Ashburton – 702 AM
 Timaru – 1494 AM
 Dunedin – 693 AM
 Southland – 558 AM

References

External links 
 Corporate Site
 TRB Site

New Zealand radio networks
New Zealand Media and Entertainment
Adult contemporary radio stations